Fútbol Club Jove Español San Vicente, commonly known as Jove Español, is a Spanish professional football team based in San Vicente del Raspeig, in the Valencian Community. Founded in 2004 it plays in Tercera División RFEF – Group 6, holding home matches at Ciudad Deportiva de San Vicente del Raspeig, which has a capacity of 2,500 seats.

History
Jove Español San Vicente was founded in 2004, after the merger of three teams in the city of Sant Vicent del Raspeig: CD Jove Raspeig, CD Español de San Vicente and FC Cosmos San Vicente. It first reached Tercera División two years later, going on to remain several consecutive seasons in that level.

It acted as a farm team for Hércules CF several times, the last one starting in 2013 and ending in 2014.

Season to season

13 seasons in Tercera División
1 season in Tercera División RFEF

Notes

References

External links
Official website 
Futbolme team profile 

Football clubs in the Valencian Community
Association football clubs established in 2004
Province of Alicante
2004 establishments in Spain